Limax luctuosus is a species of air-breathing land slug, a terrestrial pulmonate gastropod mollusk in the family Limacidae, the keelback slugs. So far, it has not been adequately investigated and is therefore an unsafe species.

Taxonomy
The taxon was first described by Alfred Moquin-Tandon in 1855 as a var. of Limax maximus. It could be a form of Limax cinereoniger or an endemic species.

Distribution
Limax luctuosus was described from France, but it should also be present in the western Alps.

References

Limacidae
Gastropods described in 1855